On 20 June 2019, an overloaded bus fell into a deep drain in Dhoth Morh, tehsil Banjar, Kullu district in Himachal Pradesh. At least 44 people died and 34 others were injured in the accident.

Accident
The private bus registration number (HP 66-7065) was running on Kullu-Gadagushaini route. Two kilometres from   Banjar bus stand, it fell into the deep gorge on a sharp turn at Bhiyoth. As the bus was travelling on an uphill section of road, near Dhoth Morh, it came to a bend where it fell down the gorge in Banjar nullah. The death toll rose to 44 and the injured were taken to Banjar hospital in ambulances. The injured were getting treatment at Banjar and Kullu hospitals, whereas seriously injured were sent to PGIMER, Chandigarh. Most of the victims were students of Government Degree College, Banjar going back to home.

Investigation
The Chief Minister, Jai Ram Thakur Himachal Pradesh, ordered a magisterial inquiry to be conducted by the Additional District Magistrate, Kullu. Thakur said that stern action will be taken against the bus owners if found guilty of overloading.

References

External links

Bus incidents in India
History of Himachal Pradesh (1947–present)
2010s in Himachal Pradesh
Disasters in Himachal Pradesh
Kullu district
2019 road incidents
2019 disasters in India
June 2019 events in India